Bluetip was an American rock band from Washington, D.C., forming in March 1995 by ex-members of Swiz. They released four albums, an EP, and a number of singles before splitting up in January 2002. Originally, the band was to be named The Ohio Blue Tip, however the name was shortened to Bluetip early on.

In 2001, when Farrell moved to New York, the band eventually folded. 

Farrell and Joe Gorelick from Bluetip continued making music in a very similar vein under the band name Retisonic, starting in 2002, with Jim Kimball on bass.

The band Red Hare was formed in 2013 by three former members of Bluetip (Farrell, Gorelick, and Dave Stern) and three former members of both Swiz and Sweetbelly Freakdown (Farrell, Stern, and Shawn Brown. The band has been known to performs Swiz songs in some live performances, in addition to original Red Hare songs.

Members

Final lineup
Brian Clancy (guitar, 1999–2001)
Jason Farrell (guitar/vocals)
James A. Kump (bass)
Areif Dasha Sless-Kitain (drums, 2000–2001)

Previous members
Dave Bryson (drums, 1998–2000)
Zac Eller (drums, 1995–1996)
Joe Gorelick (drums, 1996)
Aaron Ford (drums, 1996–1998)
Dave Stern (guitar, 1995–1999)

Discography

Studio albums
Dischord No. 101 (Dischord, June 1996)
Join Us (Dischord, November 1998)
Polymer (Dischord, September 2000)

Singles and EPs
Ohio 7-inch (Discord/Hellfire, August 1995)
Bluetip/Kerosene 454 split 7-inch (Maggadee, September 1996)
Join Us/No. 2 7-inch (Dischord, March 1998)
Bluetip/NRA split 7-inch (B-Core Disc, November 1999)
Hot (-) Fast (+) Union CDEP (Slowdime, May 2000)

Compilation albums
Post Mortem Anthem (Dischord, 2001)

Compilation appearances
 Not One Light Red: A Desert Extended (Sunset Alliance, 2002) - "Newport"

References

External links
VH1 Bio

Punk rock groups from Washington, D.C.
Dischord Records artists
American post-hardcore musical groups